Pygopleurus is a genus of beetles from the Glaphyridae family.

Species
Species within this genus include:

 Pygopleurus akbesianus
 Pygopleurus aleppensis
 Pygopleurus anahitae
 Pygopleurus anemonius
 Pygopleurus angulatus
 Pygopleurus apicalis
 Pygopleurus banghaasi
 Pygopleurus basalis
 Pygopleurus besucheti
 Pygopleurus bimaculatus
 Pygopleurus caesareae
 Pygopleurus cirrius
 Pygopleurus costatus
 Pygopleurus cyaneoviolaceus
 Pygopleurus cyanescens
 Pygopleurus demelti
 Pygopleurus despectus
 Pygopleurus deuvei
 Pygopleurus diffusus
 Pygopleurus distinctus
 Pygopleurus distinguenda
 Pygopleurus foina
 Pygopleurus gordyenensis
 Pygopleurus hirsutus
 Pygopleurus humeralis
 Pygopleurus immundus
 Pygopleurus israelitus
 Pygopleurus kareli
 Pygopleurus katbehi
 Pygopleurus keithi
 Pygopleurus koniae
 Pygopleurus labaumei
 Pygopleurus libanonensis
 Pygopleurus lucarellii
 Pygopleurus lyciensis
 Pygopleurus madenensis
 Pygopleurus mardiensis
 Pygopleurus medius
 Pygopleurus mithridates
 Pygopleurus monticola
 Pygopleurus orientalis
 Pygopleurus ottomanus
 Pygopleurus ponticus
 Pygopleurus pseudomedius
 Pygopleurus psilotrichius
 Pygopleurus rapuzzii
 Pygopleurus ressli
 Pygopleurus rufovillosus
 Pygopleurus samai
 Pygopleurus scutellatus
 Pygopleurus sexualis
 Pygopleurus simplex
 Pygopleurus sinaicus
 Pygopleurus syriacus
 Pygopleurus transcaucasicus
 Pygopleurus tristis
 Pygopleurus weilli
 Pygopleurus vulpes
 Pygopleurus zagrosensis

References

Scarabaeoidea genera
Glaphyridae